Gwamegi is a Korean half-dried Pacific herring or Pacific saury made during winter. It is mostly eaten in the region of North Gyeongsang Province in places such as Pohang, Uljin, and Yeongdeok, where a large amount of the fish are harvested. Guryongpo Harbor in Pohang is the most famous.

Fresh herring or saury is frozen at -10 degrees Celsius and is placed outdoors in December to repeat freezing at night and thawing during the day. The process continues until the water content of the fish drops to approximately 40%.

There are records of gwamegi in the Joseon era document Ohjuyeonmunjangjeonsango (hangul:오주연문장전산고, hanja:五洲衍文長箋算稿) which mentions: "herring is smoked in order to prevent rotting". In another document Gyuhapcheongseo (hangul:규합총서, hanja:閨閤叢書), it is written: "herring with clear eyes are chosen to be dried, which give an unusual taste".

The city of Pohang holds an annual Gwamegi Festival to promote the local specialty food. It started in 1997 to promote gwamegi and boost local economies. It is held in November every year and hosts various programs, such as a specialty product contest, free tasting events, and playing traditional Korean music. Some of the major events include the auction of gwamegi as well as guessing the weight of a gwamegi.

History
Pohang's Young-Il Bay, which is full of seaweed, was a place where herring herds scattered in the winter. The herring was a major food item when it was thrown into a net, but the problem was how to keep it so that it could be eaten at all times. However, someone hung the herring in a kitchen window (small ventilated window), which had a smoking effect because the smoke was coming from the kitchen.

Since then, people have all hung herring in the kitchen window and started to spend the winter. The herring was frozen in the cold winter winds, then melted and dried during the cooking cycle, leaving half dry. The tooth tasted great. The Young-Il Bay people who learned how to freeze and dry the fish further developed by doing this by placing herring on the beach of Guryongpo, where the sun was blazing during the day and the cool sea breeze was hanging at night.

Since the 1960s, herring has drastically decreased in the Younh-Il Bay, making gwamegi with mackerel pike caught in large quantities, and it tasted as good as herring. Even today, GwamegI is still made from mackerel pike.

Acting both as a research center and a tourist attraction, the Gwamegi Culture Museum (구룡포 과메기 문화관), a large museum detailing the history, science and traditions behind gwamegi, was opened in Guryongpo in 2016.

Gallery

See also

 Soused herring, Dutch raw herring
 Dried and salted cod
 Hoe (dish)
 Gravlax, Scandinavian cured raw salmon
 Korean cuisine
 List of dried foods
 List of smoked foods
 Lox, Jewish cured salmon fillet
 Lutefisk, Scandinavian salted/dried whitefish
 Rakfisk, Norwegian salted and fermented fish

References

Further reading

External links

 Festivals in Pohang

Korean seafood dishes
Dried fish
Smoked fish
Herring dishes